Sergey Yuryevich Kiselnikov (19 May 1958 – 2 December 2020) was a Russian Soviet football player.

Honours
 1977 FIFA World Youth Championship winner with the Soviet Union.

References

External links
 

1958 births
People from Vologda
2020 deaths
Soviet footballers
FC Dynamo Vologda players
FC Dynamo Moscow reserves players
Association football defenders
FC Amur Blagoveshchensk players
Footballers from Vologda